Disney Channel Holiday Playlist is a 2012 holiday album released on October 2, 2012. The album features musical artists associated or popularized by Disney Channel like Bridgit Mendler, Bella Thorne, Zendaya, Adam Hicks, Ross Lynch, McClain Sisters and Coco Jones singing their own versions of holiday songs. Some songs were recorded prior to the production of this album, while others were recorded specifically for it.

Track listing

Charts

Release history

References

Christmas compilation albums
2012 Christmas albums
Pop rock Christmas albums
Pop compilation albums
2012 compilation albums
Teen pop albums
Pop rock compilation albums
Walt Disney Records compilation albums
Walt Disney Records Christmas albums
Disney Channel albums